The men's extreme canoe slalom K-1 competition at the 2019 Pan American Games in Lima took place between 2 and 4 August at the Cañete River in Lunahuaná.

The gold medal was won by Pepe Gonçalves of the Brzail.

Schedule 
All times are Local Time (UTC−5).

Results

Heats

Semifinals

Final

References 

Men's extreme slalom K-1